The men's 1500 metres event at the 1998 Commonwealth Games was held 20–21 September on National Stadium, Bukit Jalil.

Medalists

Results

Heats
Qualification: First 4 of each heat (Q) and the next 4 fastest (q) qualified for the semifinals.

Final

References

1500
1998